Frank Collins may refer to:

Frank Collins (British Army soldier) (1956–1998), SAS soldier and Church of England minister
Frank Collins (footballer) (1893–?), Irish footballer
Frank Collins (ice hockey) (1901–1940), Canadian ice hockey player
Frank Collins (musician) (born 1947), British composer, singer and arranger
Frank Collins (Australian cricketer) (1910–2001), Australian cricketer
Frank Collins (English cricketer) (1903–1988), English cricketer
Frank Shipley Collins (1848–1920), American botanist and algologist
Frank Collins (rugby league), Australian rugby league footballer 
Frank Collins (seaman)

See also
Francis Collins (disambiguation)
Frank Collin (born 1944), American political activist
Frank Collins Emerson